Yury Aleksandrovich Malyshev (born 1 February 1947) is a former Soviet competition rower and Olympic champion.

Malyshev was born in Khimki in 1947. He received a gold medal in single sculls at the 1972 Summer Olympics in Munich.

References

1947 births
Russian male rowers
Rowers at the 1972 Summer Olympics
Olympic rowers of the Soviet Union
Medalists at the 1972 Summer Olympics
Olympic medalists in rowing
Olympic gold medalists for the Soviet Union
Living people
People from Khimki
Sportspeople from Moscow Oblast